Cañada de los Alamos is a census-designated place (CDP) in Santa Fe County, New Mexico, United States. It is part of the Santa Fe, New Mexico Metropolitan Statistical Area. The population was 434 at the 2010 census.

Geography
Cañada de los Alamos is located at  (35.585522, -105.857855).

Demographics

As of the census of 2000, there were 358 people, 153 households, and 91 families residing in the CDP. The population density was 128.0 people per square mile (49.4/km2). There were 165 housing units at an average density of 59.0 per square mile (22.8/km2). The racial makeup of the CDP was 71.79% White, 1.96% Native American, 0.28% Asian, 20.39% from other races, and 5.59% from two or more races. Hispanic or Latino of any race were 44.69% of the population.

There were 153 households, out of which 31.4% had children under the age of 18 living with them, 43.8% were married couples living together, 8.5% had a female householder with no husband present, and 40.5% were non-families. 30.1% of all households were made up of individuals, and 6.5% had someone living alone who was 65 years of age or older. The average household size was 2.34 and the average family size was 2.97.

In the CDP, the population was spread out, with 25.1% under the age of 18, 5.0% from 18 to 24, 26.0% from 25 to 44, 36.0% from 45 to 64, and 7.8% who were 65 years of age or older. The median age was 41 years. For every 100 females there were 117.0 males. For every 100 females age 18 and over, there were 114.4 males.

The median income for a household in the CDP was $44,231, and the median income for a family was $50,682. Males had a median income of $11,250 versus $43,077 for females. The per capita income for the CDP was $25,707. About 11.4% of families and 20.9% of the population were below the poverty line, including 13.5% of those under age 18 and none of those age 65 or over.

Education
It is within Santa Fe Public Schools.

See also

 List of census-designated places in New Mexico

References

External links

Census-designated places in New Mexico
Census-designated places in Santa Fe County, New Mexico